A software suite (also known as an application suite) is a collection of computer programs (application software, or programming software) of related functionality, sharing a similar user interface and the ability to easily exchange data with each other.

Features
Advantages
 Less costly than buying individual packages
 Identical or very similar GUI
 Designed to interface with each other
 Helps the learning curve of the user

Disadvantages
 Not all purchased features are always used by the user
 Takes a significant amount of disk space (bloatware), as compared to buying only the needed packages
 Requires effort to use the packages together

Types
 Office suites, such as Microsoft Office
 Internet suites
 Graphics suite, such as Adobe Creative Cloud
 IDEs, such as Eclipse, and Visual Studio

See also
 Application software
 Package (package management system)
 Runtime environment

References